Molly Moo-Cow was the name of a short-lived animated character appearing in Rainbow Parade shorts created by Burt Gillett and Tom Palmer for Van Beuren Studios in the 1930s. Six cartoons were produced.

This series was later syndicated for television. Some of these can be found in DVD collections of public domain cartoons.

Filmography

Picnic Panic (May 3, 1935)
The Hunting Season (August 19, 1935)
Molly Moo-Cow and the Butterflies (1935)
Molly Moo-Cow and the Indians (1935)
Molly Moo-Cow and Rip Van Winkle (1935)
Toonerville Trolley (January 17, 1936; cameo)
Molly Moo-Cow and Robinson Crusoe (February 28, 1936)

References

Animated characters
Van Beuren Studios
Films about cattle